Topline or TopLine may refer to:
 DeSoto Firedome Topline series, an automobile series
 TopLine Game Labs
 Topline Schools in Port Harcourt, Nigeria

See also
 Alien Terminator (1988 film), also known as Top Line, a 1988 Italian film
 The revenue in the income statement is also called top line.
 The way dancers hold their upper bodies is called top line; see Glossary of partner dance terms#Top line.